The 1978 Purdue Boilermakers football team represented Purdue University in the 1978 Big Ten Conference football season. Led by second-year head coach Jim Young, the Boilermakers compiled an overall record of 9–2–1 with a mark of 6–1–1 in conference play, placing third in the Big Ten. Purdue was invited to the Peach Bowl, where the Boilermakers defeated Georgia Tech. The team played home games at Ross–Ade Stadium in West Lafayette, Indiana.

Schedule

Personnel

Games summaries

Michigan State

    
    
    
    
    

John Macon 19 rushes, 120 yards

Ohio

at Notre Dame

Wake Forest

Ohio State

at Illinois
 John Macon 32 rushes, 126 yards
 Russell Pope 25 rushes, 118 yards

at Iowa

Northwestern

at Wisconsin
 John Macon 32 rushes, 117 yards

at Michigan

Indiana
 Mike Augustyniak 23 rushes, 135 yards

Peach Bowl (vs. Georgia Tech)

Statistics

Passing

Awards
All-Big Ten
 Ken Loushin (1st)
 Keena Turner (1st)
 Mark Herrmann (2nd)
 Marcus Jackson (2nd)
 John LeFeber (2nd)
 John Macon (2nd)
 Steve McKenzie (2nd)
 Dale Schwan (2nd)
 Scott Sovereen (2nd)

Big Ten Coach of the Year: Jim Young

References

External links
 

Purdue
Purdue Boilermakers football seasons
Peach Bowl champion seasons
Purdue Boilermakers football